Kampong Penabai is a coastal village in Tutong District, Brunei, about  from the district town Pekan Tutong. The population was 888 in 2016. It is one of the villages within Mukim Pekan Tutong, a mukim in the district.

Etymology 
The village is named after the Bruneian Malay ethnic group who had migrated to the area from the present-day Brunei-Muara District, mainly descendants of the Kampong Ayer people.

Facilities 
Pengiran Muda Mahkota Primary School is the village primary school; it was inaugurated on 14 October 1962 by Sultan Omar Ali Saifuddien III, the then Sultan of Brunei. It is named after Sultan Hassanal Bolkiah who was at that time the Crown Prince.

Kampong Penabai Mosque, the village mosque, was established in 1981 initially as a surau. The current building was built in 1993 and can accommodate 200 worshippers.

References 

Penabai